Ornithinibacillus contaminans is a Gram-positive and spore-forming bacterium from the genus of Ornithinibacillus which has been isolated from human blood from Göteborg in Sweden.

References

External links 

Type strain of Ornithinibacillus contaminans at BacDive -  the Bacterial Diversity Metadatabase

Bacillaceae
Bacteria described in 2010